The 1982–83 Ranji Trophy was the 49th season of the Ranji Trophy. Karnataka won the final against Bombay on first innings lead.

Bombay scored 534 runs in the final. Karnataka lost their sixth wicket at 293 but were revived by a seventh wicket partnership of 154 between Roger Binny and J. Abhiram. They still lost their ninth wicket at 526. Raghuram Bhat and B. Vijayakrishna took the score to 535 when the latter was out. On the final day, Sandeep Patil scored 121* before lunch. Bombay declared setting Karnataka to score 197 in two sessions. Karnataka instead played out 70 overs to score 179 for 5 and win the title on first innings lead.

Highlights
 Roger Binny of Karnataka scored 115 & 45 in the final. In the semifinal against Haryana he took 8 for 22 and scored 54 (highest score of the match).
 Hoshedar Contractor, son of former Indian captain Nari Contractor, made his only first class appearance in the Bombay - Orissa quarter final and scored a zero.
 C.S. Suresh Kumar who made his debut for Tamil Nadu scored 146 and 162 in his second and third matches and 110 against Delhi in the quarter final.

Group stage

North Zone

West Zone

South Zone

Central Zone

East Zone

Knockout stage

Final

Scorecards and averages
Cricketarchive

References

External links

1983 in Indian cricket
Domestic cricket competitions in 1982–83
Ranji Trophy seasons